The 1848 Whig National Convention was a presidential nominating convention held from June 7 to 9 in Philadelphia. It nominated the Whig Party's candidates for president and vice president in the 1848 election. The convention selected General Zachary Taylor of Louisiana for president and former Representative Millard Fillmore of New York for vice president.

Taylor and General Winfield Scott had both emerged as contenders for the Whig presidential nomination after serving in the Mexican–American War, while two long-time party leaders, Senator Henry Clay of Kentucky and Senator Daniel Webster of Massachusetts, also commanded support in the party. With Southern delegates united around his candidacy, Taylor took the lead on the first ballot. Clay finished a strong second to Taylor on the first ballot of the convention, but his support faded on subsequent ballots and Taylor took the nomination on the fourth ballot.

After Webster declined the vice presidential nomination, Fillmore and businessman Abbott Lawrence of Massachusetts emerged as the top choices for vice president. Fillmore clinched the nomination on the second ballot. The Whig ticket went on to win the 1848 presidential election, defeating the Democratic ticket of Lewis Cass and William O. Butler.

The Convention 

The convention was held from June 7 to 9 in Philadelphia, Pennsylvania. Every state was represented except for Texas. It was chaired by John A. Collier and John M. Morehead. Taylor had been courted by both the Democrats and the Whigs, but ultimately declared himself a Whig. The platform adopted largely consisted of praise for Taylor, with less attention paid to specific policies.

The venue for the convention was Chinese Museum Building. The building since was destroyed by fire in 1854.

There were 280 individuals seated as delegates to the convention.

Presidential nomination 
By 1847, General Zachary Taylor had emerged as a contender for the Whig nomination in the 1848 presidential election. Despite Taylor's largely unknown political views, many Whigs believed he was the party's strongest possible candidate due to his martial accomplishments in the Mexican–American War. Henry Clay initially told his allies that he would not run in the 1848 presidential election, but he was unwilling to support Taylor, a "mere military man.". Although Daniel Webster and General Winfield Scott each commanded a limited base of support in the party, Taylor and Clay each saw the other as their lone serious rival for the Whig nomination.

Taylor led on the first ballot and grew his lead on subsequent ballots. On the fourth ballot, he secured 171 votes and won the presidential nomination.

Candidates

Vice Presidential nomination

Vice Presidential candidates

Withdrawn

Declined

Balloting 
Webster was offered the vice presidential spot on the ticket, but declined. Former New York Representative Millard Fillmore was chosen as the vice presidential candidate on the second ballot.

See also 
 U.S. presidential nomination convention
 1848 United States presidential election
 1848 Democratic National Convention

References

Bibliography 
 
 Holt, Michael F. (1999). The Rise and Fall of the American Whig Party: Jacksonian Politics and the Onset of the Civil War. Oxford University Press. .

Primary sources 
 Chester, Edward W A guide to political platforms (1977) online
 Porter, Kirk H. and Donald Bruce Johnson, eds. National party platforms, 1840-1964 (1965) online 1840-1956

External links 

 <http://www.ourcampaigns.com/RaceDetail.html?RaceID=58512> Accessed: June 11, 2016

1848 United States presidential election
Whig National Conventions
Political conventions in Philadelphia
1848 in Pennsylvania
1848 conferences
Whig National Convention